Big Easy Motors is an American reality television series. The series premiered on July 5, 2016, on History.

Episodes

References

External links
 

2010s American reality television series
2016 American television series debuts
History (American TV channel) original programming
2017 American television series endings